Tunisia, participated at the 1999 All-Africa Games held in Greater Johannesburg, South Africa. The team won 63 medals.

Medal summary

Medal table

See also
 Tunisia at the All-Africa Games

References

Nations at the 1999 All-Africa Games
1999
1999 in Tunisian sport